The 2016 City of Jesolo Trophy was the ninth edition of the City of Jesolo Trophy gymnastics competition, held at the SGA Gymnasium in Jesolo, Italy from March 19–20, 2016. Teams from Italy, United States, Brazil and France attended, as well as junior individuals from Canada, Germany, Slovenia, and Finland.

Medalists

Results

Seniors

Team

All-around

Vault

Uneven bars

Balance beam

Floor exercise

Junior competition

All-around

Vault

Uneven bars

Balance beam

Floor exercise

Participants

Italy

Senior 
 Giorgia Campana
 Desiree Carofiglio
 Carlotta Ferlito
 Alessia Leolini
 Enus Mariani
 Tea Ugrin

Junior 
 Giorgia Villa
 Martina Maggio
 Noemi Linari
 Maria Vittoria Cocciolo
 Asia D'Amato
 Sidney Saturnino
 Martina Basile
 Giulia Bencini
 Elisa Iorio
 Sara Berardinelli
 Giorgia Balottari

United States 

The US team was as follows.

Senior 
 Gabrielle Douglas – Virginia Beach, Va. (Buckeye)
 Emily Gaskins – Coral Springs, Fla. (Palm Beach)
 Laurie Hernandez – Old Bridge, N.J. (MG Elite, Inc.)
 Sydney Johnson-Scharpf – Groveland, Fla. (Brandy Johnson's)
 Ashton Locklear – Hamlet, N.C. (Everest)
 Aly Raisman – Needham, Mass. (Brestyan's)
 Emily Schild – Huntersville, N.C. (Everest)
 MyKayla Skinner – Gilbert, Ariz. (Desert Lights)
 Ragan Smith – Lewisville, Texas (Texas Dreams)

Junior 
 Jordan Chiles – Vancouver, Wash. (Naydenov)
 Emma Malabuyo – Flower Mound, Texas (Texas Dreams)
 Gabrielle Perea – Geneva, Ill. (Legacy Elite)
 Trinity Thomas – York, Pa. (Prestige)

Brazil

Seniors 
The Brazil senior team was as follows.
 Rebeca Andrade
 Jade Barbosa
 Daniele Hypólito
 Lorrane Oliveira
 Flávia Saraiva

France 

 Marine Brevet
 Anne Kuhm
 Louise Vanhille
 Loan His
 Camille Bahl
 Marine Boyer
 Oreane Lechenault

Canada 

 Ana Padurariu
 Jade Chrobok

Germany 
 Helene Schaffer
 Lisa Schoniger

Slovenia 
 Lucija Hribar
 Pia Hribar
 Lara Crnjac

Finland
 Enni Kuttenen
 Tira Kuitunen
 Emilia Kemppi

References 

2016 in gymnastics
City of Jesolo Trophy
2016 in Italian sport
International gymnastics competitions hosted by Italy